The Perfect House may refer to:
 The Perfect House (2011 American film), directed by Kris Hulbert and Randy Kent
 The Perfect House (2011 Indonesian film), directed by Affandi Abdul Rachman